Pinheirodon is a genus of extinct mammal from Portugal. It is a member of the also extinct order of Multituberculata, and shared the world with dinosaurs. It is placed in the suborder "Plagiaulacida" and family Pinheirodontidae.

The species on which the genus is based has been designated as Pinheirodon sp. It is known from isolated fossil teeth.

Initially considered Early Cretaceous, Pinheirodon is from the locality of Porto Dinheiro (Lourinhã, Portugal) which is Late Jurassic (Tithonian).

References 
 Most of this information has been derived from  MESOZOIC MAMMALS: Basal Multituberculata, an Internet directory.
 Kielan-Jaworowska Z. and Hurum J.H. (2001), "Phylogeny and Systematics of multituberculate mammals". Paleontology 44, p. 389-429.
 Hahn & Hahn (1999), Pinheirodontidae n. fam. (Multituberculata) (Mammalia) aus der tiefen Unter-Kreide Portugals.(Pinheirodontidae n. fam. (Multituberculata) (Mammalia) from the deepest Lower Cretaceous of Portugal). Palaeontographica Abt. A Vol. 253, pp. 77–222.

Multituberculates
Early Cretaceous mammals of Europe
Fossils of Portugal
Prehistoric mammal genera
Fossil taxa described in 1999